The 2008 UEFA Women's Cup Final was played on 17 May and 24 May 2008 between Frankfurt of Germany and Umeå of Sweden. Frankfurt won 4–3 on aggregate.

Match details

First leg

Second leg

References

Women's Cup
Uefa Women's Cup Final 2008
Uefa Women's Cup Final 2008
2008
UEFA
UEFA
Sports competitions in Umeå
Football in Frankfurt
21st century in Frankfurt
Sports competitions in Frankfurt
May 2008 sports events in Europe
2000s in Hesse